ICON is a launched roller coaster at Blackpool Pleasure Beach in Blackpool, Lancashire, England. Manufactured by Mack Rides of Germany, the ride opened on 25 May 2018 at a total cost of £16.25 million. The ride is the first multi-launch roller coaster in the United Kingdom, and the first brand new rollercoaster at the park in 24 years. It uses a series of  linear magnetic synchronous motors to propel and slow the trains along the track. Icon serves as the park's sixth steel roller coaster and tenth roller coaster overall. The name "Icon" was announced on 10 April 2017 with the tagline, "Dare To Ride”.

In 2022, a spinning car was added to the back of one of the trains, with the tagline "ENSO". This experience however is an upcharge attraction starting at £15 a ride and rising to £25 a ride for VIP.

History 

On 28 September 2016, Blackpool Pleasure Beach released plans for a new steel roller coaster entitled "Construction 2018" that would be constructed by Mack Rides at the cost of £16,250,000 for the 2018 season; in addition, they released a simulated POV of the ride. Soon after on 1 December 2016, construction on the ride began, and on 30 March 2017 the foundations for the ride were around 80 percent completed with 282 concrete cylinders driven for main pilings. On 10 April 2017, the park announced the official name of the ride, Icon. Around the time of announcement, 8,000 metres of steel tubes and pre-cast concrete piles had been placed 12 metres into the ground and 5,500 tonnes of soil had been dug out.
The first pieces of track for Icon arrived at Blackpool Pleasure Beach on 19 October 2017, a few weeks after the arrival of the first supports which arrived on 29 September 2017. The final piece of track for the ride was installed on 14 February 2018, with both Amanda Thompson and Nick Thompson signing the interior of the steelwork.

Icon officially opened on 25 May 2018.

In 2021, the lap bars were modified to have seatbelts fitted. Later that year, it was announced that the ride would be getting a spinning car at the back of one of the trains for the 2022 season.

Ride experience
This is due to the back row seats being designed for larger guests. A "Speedy Pass" is available for the ride (this gives guests the ability to skip a queue), being accessible from the bottom of the Big Dipper's steps. Speedy Pass riders embark from a queue parallel to the main queue inside of the station and are generally boarded on the back row of the ride unless the rider is under .

The ride begins by slowly rolling out of the station to the launch area. The top hat then passes under the Big One's lift hill. This is followed by a shallow non-inverting inclined loop before a series of banked turns, intertwining with the Big Dipper and Steeplechase before turning over steeplechase's brake run and navigating through a Downward Barrel Roll. After diving into another tunnel, a second LSM launch follows , which goes into a non-inverting  Junior Immelmann loop, the tallest part of the layout. A series of highly banked turns, airtime hills, a helix and 2 S-curves follow, before the train hits the final brake run and re-enters the station.

The on-ride photo is taken prior to the train entering the tunnel on the first launch.

References

External links
 Blackpool Pleasure Beach: ICON

Steel roller coasters
Blackpool Pleasure Beach
Roller coasters in the United Kingdom
2018 establishments in England